Viktor Afanasyev may refer to:

 Viktor Afanasyev (cosmonaut) (born 1948), Russian cosmonaut
 Viktor Afanasyev (politician) (1922–1994), Soviet politician and editor
 Viktor Afanasyev (military musician) (1947–2020), Soviet and Russian military conductor